Yinghuangia is an Actinobacteria genus in the family Streptomycetaceae.

References 

Streptomycineae
Bacteria genera